Kadayiruppu is a village on the outskirts of Kolenchery town in Kerala, India. Kadayiruppu located 4  km from Kolenchery on Perumbavoor Road. It possesses all the basic amenities of development and the village is well equipped with administrative support by the panchayat.

References

Cities and towns in Ernakulam district

https://www.google.com/search?q=kadayiruppu&tbm=isch&ved=2ahUKEwi2pNiR3cf6AhXNITQIHdCYCtYQ2-cCegQIABAA&oq=kadayiruppu&gs_lcp=CgNpbWcQAzIFCAAQgAQyBQgAEIAEMgUIABCABDIFCAAQgAQyBggAEB4QBTIGCAAQHhAFMgYIABAeEAUyBwgAEIAEEBgyBwgAEIAEEBgyBwgAEIAEEBg6BwgAELEDEEM6BAgAEEM6BAgjECc6CAgAEIAEELEDOgcIIxDqAhAnOgsIABCABBCxAxCDAToECAAQA1DBDVjJNmCFOWgBcAB4AIABiAGIAbsRkgEEMjAuNJgBAKABAaoBC2d3cy13aXotaW1nsAEIwAEB&sclient=img&ei=rME8Y7aeDc3D0PEP0LGqsA0&bih=660&biw=1290&rlz=1C1RXQR_enCA994CA994